Step into Liquid (2003) is a documentary about surfing directed by Dana Brown, son of famed surfer and filmmaker Bruce Brown. The film includes surfing footage from the famous Pipeline, the beaches of Vietnam, and some of the world's largest waves, at Cortes Bank. The film was Dana Brown's first solo project.

Featured surfers

 Robert August
 Rochelle Ballard
 Shawn Barron
 Layne Beachley
 Bob "Aquadoc" Beaton
 Jesse Brad Billauer
 Bruce Brown
 Taj Burrow
 Ken Collins
 Peter Davis
 Ami DiCamillo
 Darrick Doerner
 Richie Fitzgerald
 James Fulbright
 Brad Gerlach
 Laird Hamilton
 Dave Kalama
 Keala Kennelly
 Alex Knost
 Jim Knost
 Gerry Lopez
 Rob Machado
 Chris Malloy
 Dan Malloy
 Keith Malloy
 Andy Matthias
 Peter Mel
 Mike Parsons
 Lester Priday
 Kelly Slater
 Mike Waltze
 Robert "Wingnut" Weaver
 Dale "Daily" Webster
 Larry Williams
 Lee Williams

Production and release
The film made $3,681,803 at the box office in the United States.

The documentary is available on DVD, DVD-ROM (in WMVHD HDTV) and Blu-ray Disc. It was first released on April 20, 2004 and marked the final DVD release distributed by Artisan Entertainment.

References

External links
 Official site
 
 
 Step Into Liquid (2003) on Box Office Mojo

2003 films
2003 documentary films
Artisan Entertainment films
Documentary films about surfing
Films shot in Vietnam
Films directed by Dana Brown
American surfing films
2000s English-language films
2000s American films